The Prix Maison de la Presse is an annual French literary prize, established in 1970 by the Syndicat national des dépositaires de presse (SNDP) and Gabriel Cantin. Until 2005 it was known as Prix des Maisons de la Presse and given out in the two categories Novel (Roman) and Non-Fiction (Document), after which the name was changed and the categories merged into one.

Recipients

Novel, 1970–2020
 1970: Jean Laborde, L'Héritage de violence, Flammarion
 1971: Luc Estang, La Fille à l'oursin, Seuil
 1972: Pierre Moustiers, L'Hiver d'un gentilhomme, Gallimard
 1973: René Barjavel, Le Grand Secret, Presses de la Cité
 1974: Michel Bataille, Les Jours meilleurs, Éditions Julliard
 1975: Charles Exbrayat, Jules Matrat, Albin Michel
 1976: Guy Lagorce, Ne pleure pas, Grasset
 1977: Maurice Denuzière, Louisiane, JC Lattès
 1978: André Lacaze, Le Tunnel, Grasset
 1979: Jeanne Bourin, La Chambre des dames, la Table Ronde
 1980: Nicole Ciravégna, Les Trois Jours du cavalier, Seuil
 1981: Marguerite Gurgand, Les Demoiselles de Beaumoreau, Éditions Mazarine
 1982: Irène Frain, Le Nabab, JC Lattès
 1983: Régine Deforges, La Bicyclette bleue, Editions Ramsay
 1984: Michel Déon, Je vous écris d'Italie, Gallimard
 1985: Patrick Meney, Niet !, Éditions Mazarine
 1986: André Le Gal, Le Shangaïé, JC Lattès
 1987: Loup Durand, Daddy, Presses Pocket
 1988: Amin Maalouf, Samarkand (Samarcande), JC Lattès
 1989: Christine Arnothy, Vent africain, Grasset
 1990: Patrick Cauvin, Rue des Bons-Enfants, Albin Michel
 1991: Catherine Hermary-Vieille, Un amour fou, Ed. Olivier Orban
 1992: Christian Jacq, L'Affaire Toutankhamon, Grasset
 1993: Josette Alia, Quand le soleil était chaud, Grasset
 1994: Michel Ragon, Le Roman de Rabelais, Albin Michel
 1995: Jean Raspail, L'Anneau du pêcheur, Albin Michel
 1996: Jean-Claude Libourel, Anthonin Maillefer, Robert Laffont
 1997: Christian Signol, La Lumière des collines, Albin Michel
 1998: Bernard Clavel, Le Soleil des morts
 1999: Daniel Pennac, Aux fruits de la passion
 2000: Georges Coulonges, L'Été du grand bonheur 
 2001: Frédéric H. Fajardie, Les Foulards rouges, JC Lattès
 2002: Paul Couturiau, Le Paravent de soie rouge, Presses de la Cité
 2003: Lorraine Fouchet, L'Agence, (Robert Laffont)
 2004: Frédéric Lenoir and Violette Cabesos, La Promesse de l'ange Albin Michel
 2005: Pierre Assouline, Lutetia, Gallimard
 2006: Katherine Pancol, Les Yeux jaunes des crocodiles, Albin Michel
 2007: , L'Évangile selon Satan, Anne Carrière
 2008: Jean Teulé, Le Montespan, Éditions Julliard
 2009: Patrick Bauwen, Monster, Albin Michel
 2010: Adélaïde de Clermont-Tonnerre, Fourrure, Stock
 2011: Véronique Olmi, Cet été-là, Grasset
 2012: Michel Bussi, Un avion sans elle, Presses de la Cité
 2013: Agnès Ledig, Juste avant le bonheur, Albin Michel
 2014: François d'Épenoux, Le Réveil du cœur, Éditions Anne Carrière
 2015: Laurence Peyrin, La Drôle de Vie de Zelda Zonk, Éditions Kero
 2016: Marc Trévidic, Ahlam, JC Lattès
 2017: Philippe Besson, Arrête avec tes mensonges, Éditions Julliard
 2018: Valérie Perrin, Changer l'eau des fleurs, Albin Michel
 2019: Olivier Norek, Surface, Michel Lafon
 2020: Caroline Laurent, Rivage de la colère, Les Escales

Non-Fiction, 1970–2005
 1970: Jean Pouget, Le manifeste du camp n°1, Fayard
 1971: Brigitte Friang, Regarde-toi qui meurs, Robert Laffont
 1972: R. Auboyneau and J. Verdier, La gamelle dans le dos, Fayard
 1973: Georges Bortoli, Mort de Staline, Robert Laffont
 1974: Marie Chaix, Les lauriers du lac de Constance, Seuil
 1975: Jacques Charon, Moi, un comédien, Albin Michel
 1976: J. F. Rolland, Le Grand Capitaine, Grasset
 1977: Patrick Segal, L'homme qui marchait dans sa tête, Flammarion
 1978: Marcel Scipion, Le clos du roi, Editions Seghers
 1979: Florence Trystram, Le procès des étoiles, Editions Seghers
 1980: Philippe Lamour, Le cadran solaire, Robert Laffont
 1981: Jacques Chancel, Tant qu'il y aura des îles, Hachette Littérature
 1982: Gisèle de Monfreid, Mes secrets de la Mer Rouge, Editions France-Empire
 1984: Jean-François Chaigneau, Dix chiens pour un rêve, Albin Michel
 1985: Eric Lipmann, L'idole des années folles, Editions Balland
 1990: J. Massabki and F. Porel, La mémoire des cèdres, Robert Laffont
 1991: Noëlle Loriot, Irène Joliot-Curie, Presses de la Renaissance
 1992: Gilbert Bordes, Porteur de destins, Editions Seghers
 1993: Jean-Paul Kauffmann, L'arche des Kerguelen, Flammarion
 1994: Catherine Decours, La dernière favorite, Editions Perrin
 1995: Jean-François Deniau, Mémoires de 7 vies, Editions Plon
 1996: Jean Lartéguy, Mourir pour Jérusalem, Editions de Fallois
 1997: Frédéric Mitterrand, Les aigles foudroyés, Robert Laffont
 1998: Maurice Herzog, L'autre Annapurna, Robert Laffont
 1999: Malika Oufkir and Michèle Fitoussi, La Prisonnière, Grasset
 2000: Georges Suffert, Tu es Pierre, Editions de Fallois
 2001: Dominique Lapierre, Il était minuit cinq à Bhopal, Robert Laffont
 2002: Simone Bertière, Marie-Antoinette l'insoumise, Editions de Fallois 
 2003: Tavae Raioaoa, Si loin du monde, OH ! Editions, 2003
 2004: Françoise Rudetzki : Triple peine, Editions Calmann-Levy
 2005: Didier Long, Défense à Dieu d'entrer, Éditions Denoël

References

External links
 Official website 

Awards established in 1970
French literary awards
1970 establishments in France